Pride and Prejudice* (*sort of) is a play by Isobel McArthur, with songs, based on Jane Austen's novel. The play is designed for a cast of five or six women, each playing a servant and one or more of the main characters. After an initial production in Scotland in 2018 and a tour in 2019–20, it opened in the West End in 2021 and toured again in 2022-23. The production won the Laurence Olivier Award for Best Entertainment or Comedy Play.

Premise
The plot hews closely to the Austen novel, in a contemporary setting with some modern language. The all-female cast of five or six each play multiple characters, both servants and gentry, retelling the novel's events through the servants' eyes and performing "hilariously well-chosen karaoke songs at pivotal moments".<ref name=Roundup>[https://www.broadwayworld.com/westend/article/Review-Roundup-PRIDE-PREJUDICE-SORT-OF-is-Now-Playing-in-the-West-End-What-Did-the-Critics-Think-20211104 "Review Roundup: Pride and Prejudice* (*Sort of) is Now Playing in the West End; What Did the Critics Think?"] BroadwayWorld.com, November 4, 2021</ref>

 Productions 
The play premiered at the Tron Theatre in Glasgow, Scotland, on 28 June 2018 running until 14 July, produced by Blood of the Young. It was directed by Paul Brotherston and designed by Ana Inés Jabares-Pita. The all-female cast included Tori Burgess, Felixe Forde, Christina Gordon, Hannah Jarrett-Scott, Isobel McArthur and Meghan Tyler.

A UK tour of the production opened with the original Glasgow cast at the Bristol Old Vic (7– 28 September 2019) before touring to Northern Stage Newcastle (2 – 12 October), Birmingham Repertory Theatre (15 October – 2 November), The Royal Lyceum Theatre Edinburgh (24 January – 15 February 2020), Leeds Playhouse (25 – 29 February) Oxford Playhouse (10 – 14 March) and Nuffield Southampton Theatres (17 March, which was cancelled after two performances due to the COVID-19 pandemic). The playtext was published by Nick Hern Books on 12 September 2019.

The play began performances in London's West End at the Criterion Theatre on 15 October 2021, with an official opening on 2 November, produced by David Pugh. McArthur and Simon Harvey direct, and the cast consists of McArthur as Darcy and Mrs Bennet, Burgess as Mr Collins, Gordon as Lady Catherine de Bourgh and Jane, Jarrett-Scott as Charlotte and Charles Bingley and Tyler as Lizzie Bennet. "Comedy staging" is by Jos Houben, scenic design by Jabares-Pita, lighting design by Colin Grenfell, sound design by Michael John McCarthy and Luke Swaffield, and choreography by Emily-Jane Boyle. Songs include "Everyday I Write the Book", "Young Hearts Run Free", "Will You Love Me Tomorrow", "I Got You Babe", "Holding Out for a Hero" and "You're So Vain".

A second UK tour ran from autumn 2022 to summer 2023, opening at Cornwall's open-air Minack Theatre (22 September - 6 October 2022) and continuing to the Royal Lyceum Theatre Edinburgh (18 October - 5 November), King's Theatre Glasgow (7 - 12 November), Cambridge Arts Theatre (14 - 19 November), Sheffield's Lyceum Theatre (22 – 26 November), Salford's The Lowry (18 – 21 January 2023), Theatre Royal Newcastle (23 – 28 January), Theatre Royal Bath (30 January – 4 February), Coventry's Belgrade Theatre (7 – 11 February), Richmond Theatre (13 – 18 February), Chichester Festival Theatre (21 – 25 February), Everyman Theatre Cheltenham (6 – 11 March), Eden Court Inverness (14 – 18 March), New Theatre Cardiff (20 – 25 March), Theatre Royal Nottingham (27 March – 1 April), Congress Theatre Eastbourne (4 – 8 April), Storyhouse Chester (11 – 15 April), Birmingham Rep (17 – 22 April), Leeds Grand Theatre (24 – 29 April), Blackpool Grand (2 – 6 May), Bristol Old Vic (8 – 20 May), Hall for Cornwall Truro (22 – 27 May), Festival Theatre Malvern (30 May – 3 June) and Theatre Royal Norwich (19 – 24 June).

Critical reception
The play earned warm reviews from Variety, The Independent, The Stage, The Guardian and others, praising the adaptation and execution, but reviews in The Times and The Evening Standard'', among others, were mixed, suggesting that the script could be "sleeker".

The production was nominated for three Olivier Awards in 2022, winning for Best Entertainment or Comedy Play.

Awards and nominations

References

External links 
 Official website
 WhatsOnStage feature on the concept of the play

2018 plays
British plays
Adaptations of works by Jane Austen
Plays based on novels
West End plays
Works based on Pride and Prejudice